R.D. Engineering College (RDEC) is an engineering college, located at Ghaziabad City in the Indian state of Uttar Pradesh. The college is affiliated with Dr. A.P.J. Abdul Kalam Technical University, Lucknow, in the state of Uttar Pradesh, India.
The college provides technical as well as management courses in various streams.

History

The Rajeshwar Dayal Educational Trust was established on 20 April 2004, with the objective to impart quality education of highest standard, encourage creative talent, and establish an epicenter of excellence in learning and research. With this aim, Rameshwar Dayal Educational Trust has formed an advisory board consisting of highly qualified top level executives in the field directly related and instrumental in establishing engineering colleges in India of very high repute.

R.D. Engineering College is one of the pioneering institutions established by the Rameshwar Dayal Educational Trust. The institute was founded as a self-financing institute. This college is situated at 8th km mile stone from Ghaziabad on N.H 58, Delhi-Meerut Road, Duhai, Ghaziabad. The college is approved by the All India Council for Technical Education (A.I.C.T.E.), Ministry of HRD, Government of India and state government. The college is affiliated with Dr. A.P.J. Abdul Kalam Technical University, formerly Uttar Pradesh Technical University (UPTU).

It offers technical education in various engineering streams such as Computer Science & Engineering, Mechanical Engineering, Electronics & Communication Engineering, Information Technology and Management Courses like MBA.

Campus
The college owns a 12-acre campus and the management is planning to add more infrastructure. It has a gym. The college hostel is not quite up to the mark, although the basic facilities on offer are of top-notch quality. Of late, there has been a marked improvement in the overall quality and this stands to benefit all. Other than these, the college also provides transportation for students of the nearby area.

The RDEC library is open 10 hours daily. According to the college website (2008): "It is equipped with a large number of text and reference books and a plethora of Indian and Foreign Journals and magazines. The library is also enriched with all type of  academic resources. A Xerox is made available during working hours. The library contains texts in English and many other languages."

Labs that focus on various technological disciplines are made available for student use. The college has a very special kind of lab environment, where a teacher and a technical person are always in the lab to provide guidance. There are also special labs available for seniors to work with cutting-edge technology. The college faculties provides a lot of guidance, in order for students to have a good grasp on technical areas.

Organisation and administration
The college was set up by the Rameshwar Dayal Education Trust.

Academic profile

The institution is approved by the All India Council for Technical Education, recognized by the Government of Uttar Pradesh, and affiliated with Uttar Pradesh Technical University in Lucknow.

New and improved training modules are being introduced every academic year, keeping up with the changing times, so as to benefit the students. These training do help to improve their overall skills and to a large extent, enhances their chances of securing jobs greatly. The college is also putting in a lot of effort to teach them skills that will help them survive the intense competition of the present times.

With the  college environment being very discipline, strict action is taken in case students are caught bunking lectures. They will be suspended and parents/ guardians are intimated by the respective head of departments. Moreover, regular performance tests are conducted every Monday (2 subjects/ week)

References

Engineering colleges in Ghaziabad, Uttar Pradesh
Dr. A.P.J. Abdul Kalam Technical University
Private engineering colleges in Uttar Pradesh